Hoseynabad-e Pashmi (also Romanized as Ḩoseynābād-e Pashmī; also known as Ḩoseynābād) is a village in Garizat Rural District, Nir District, Taft County, Yazd Province, Iran. At the 2006 census, its population was 15, in 4 families.

References 

Populated places in Taft County